Darreh Arzani (also Romanized as Darreh Arzanī, Darreh Arzānī, and Darreh-ye Arzenī; also known as Dar-e Arzānī, Darreh Arzan, and Derah Arzāni) is a village in Tang Chenar Rural District, in the Central District of Mehriz County, Yazd Province, Iran. At the 2006 census, its population was 17, in 6 families.

References 

Populated places in Mehriz County